Benedict Brodie Albert Geddes (born 31 July 2001) is an English cricketer. He made his Twenty20 debut on 21 June 2021, for Surrey in the 2021 T20 Blast. He had previously been awarded a two-year deal with the team. On 6 July 2021, he made his first-class debut, for Surrey in the 2021 County Championship, as a replacement player for Will Jacks. He made his List A debut on 22 July 2021, for Surrey in the 2021 Royal London One-Day Cup.

Early life
Formerly a pupil at  St John's School, Leatherhead, he joined Surrey’s youth cricket teams at  the under-9 age group. He played grade cricket in New South Wales across the 2019-20 Australian summer and was made first-team captain at Ashtead Cricket Club in the Surrey Championship.

References

External links
 

2001 births
Living people
Cricketers from Epsom
English cricketers
Surrey cricketers